Primož Repar (born 16 June 1967, Ljubljana) is a Slovenian poet, writer, philosopher, translator, essayist, editor, publisher and organizer of international cultural and scientific / professional events, workshops, festivals, conferences, symposia, various scientific and professional research, and other initiatives at home and abroad.

Education
He studied philosophy and history at the Faculty of Arts, University of Ljubljana in 1997. From 2001 on studying graduate for a doctor's degree in researching the philosophy of Søren Kierkegaard. In 2009 he obtained a Ph.D. with the title Kierkegaard: The Question of Choice and Existential Communication at the Faculty of Arts, University of Ljubljana. In 1993 he studied at International Peoples’ College in Elsingore, Denmark (Danish language intensive course).

Work 
Repar is co-founder of the Publishing house KUD Apokalipsa and has been the chief editor since its inception in 1993. He has been responsible for printing more than 300 books and 300 number of magazines in 28 years. He is director of Central European Research Institute Søren Kierkegaard Ljubljana since 2013. At the same time, he coordinates the international Philosophic Symposium of Miklavž Ocepek since its foundation and the major central European and Southest European literary project "Revija v reviji (Review within Review)" since 2002.  He is also one of the founders of The Slovene haiku association, active in founding World Haiku Association.[8/7] He is the head organizer of festivals (Slovene and International Haiku festivals, Slovene-Danish festival), international relations, meetings, financing, editor of some of the literature and philosophy editions. He is Slovenian leading professional of Kierkegaard in Slovenia. He is also a member of several international editorial boards, including the journals of the Slovak Academy of Sciences Filozofia and Acte Kierkegaardiane. He has been in advisory board of philosophical review of Slovac Adacemy of Science Filozofia since 2012 and he was also in advisery board of the international cultural review Orient Express (Great Britain, 2002–2006).

He wrote his first collection of poems, The Cross and the Hammer, in 1984–1987. It is a kind of subversive poetic manifesto of "punk diversion" with existentially colored poetry. There are also traces of the first reading of the Danish philosopher, Søren Kierkegaard, the founder of existentialism and the inspirer of many contemporary philosophical, theological, literary and interdisciplinary fields. He began writing Haiku poetry during his stay in Denmark, where he also became a member of the Kierkegaard Society. After returning from Denmark he became a member of the Danish-Slovenian Friendship Society and the Slovenian Haiku Society. He has been a member of the Slovene Writers' Association since 1997 and he was also a member of its managing board in 2020.

As an independent researcher and head of professional programs at the Central European Research Institute Søren Kierkegaard collaborates and occasionally lectures at many European universities and institutes, and his Existential Revolution has so far been published in five languages (English, French, Slovak, Polish and Slovene). He also published the first monographies of Søren Kierkegaard in Slovene language in two books: Kierkegaard – the Question of Choice and Kierkegaard – Existential Communication. In 2018, he attended the 24th World Philosophical Congress in Beijing, China, where he lectured on the "Politics of Love" and co-organized lectures in the field of tables related to Kierkegaard's thought.

Some of his books were nominated for the highest national awards for literature or essayistic books (2001 – award of Marjan Rožanc, 2008 – award of Simon Jenko). As editor and publisher he was awarded at the International Publishers Meeting in Croatia (Put u središte Europe, 2007) as the best editor/publisher of the year, as editor and poet also in Romania (Arad, 2011), as editor and international collaborator in Bosnia and Hercegovina (Banja Luka, 2013). He has received a special award of dean of Faculty of Arts Constantine the Philosopher University in Nitra, Slovakia. In march of 2014 he received a medallion of St. Olaf College (Minnesota, USA) for excellent organisation of 4th International Philosophical Symposium od Miklavž Ocepek in honor of the bicentennial of the birth of Søren Kierkegaard that took place in 2013 in Slovenia.

He has compiled or edited several anthologies of poetry in Slovene, international editions and the Montenegrin language, as well as Slovene contemporary philosophy in the Czech language (Nová oikonomie vztahů). He also edited the Slovenian bibliography on Kierkegaard for the world edition at Routledge (2017). His 14 books and independent monographs have so far been published in Slovene, Slovak, Czech, English, French, Croatian, Montenegrin, Serbian, Macedonian, Polish, Hungarian and Danish. In addition to Danish, he translates professional and literary texts from Croatian, Serbian, Slovak, Czech, English and Norwegian.

Selected bibliography

Poetry 
Križ in kladivo (The Cross and the Hammer). Ljubljana: Artus, 1992. 

Onkraj sveta je krhka pajčevina (Beyond this World is a Fragile Cobweb). Ljubljana: Emonika, 1994.

Stanja darežljivosti (States of generosity). Ljubljana: Mladinska knjiga, 2008.

Primož Repar (2020). Trije dana u Istri i jedan dan prije. Nova istra, Istrski ogranak DHK.

Essays 

Singularity and The Existential Turn. European Journal of Science and Theology, 2012.

Scientific monographs

Translations of Kierkegaard's works

Other translation works

References

External links 
https://www.apokalipsa.si/zalozba/
http://www.kierkegaard-institute.si/

1967 births
Living people
Slovenian poets
Slovenian male poets
21st-century Slovenian philosophers
20th-century Slovenian philosophers
Writers from Ljubljana
University of Ljubljana alumni
Academic staff of the University of Ljubljana
Kierkegaard scholars
Anti-capitalists
Anti-consumerists
Continental philosophers
Critical theorists
Philosophers of art
Philosophers of culture
Philosophers of education
Philosophers of history
Critics of postmodernism